Marco Piccoli (born 30 October 2001) is an Italian professional footballer who plays as a midfielder for  club U.C. AlbinoLeffe.

References

External links
 

2001 births
Italian footballers
Association football midfielders
Serie C players
U.C. AlbinoLeffe players
Living people